"Redneck Woman" is the debut single of American country music artist Gretchen Wilson, released on March 15, 2004, from her debut studio album, Here for the Party (2004). Wilson co-wrote the song with John Rich. It is Wilson's only number-one single on the US Billboard Hot Country Singles & Tracks chart. The song also reached number 22 on the Billboard Hot 100. Internationally, the song found modest success in Australia, Ireland, and the United Kingdom, reaching number 50 on the Australian Singles Chart, number 45 on the Irish Singles Chart, and number 42 on the UK Singles Chart.

The song, which is considered Wilson's signature song, also earned a Grammy Award for Best Female Country Vocal Performance in 2005. In June 2014, Rolling Stone ranked the song number 97 on the "100 Greatest Country Songs of All Time".

Chart performance
The song spent five weeks at number one on the Hot Country Songs charts. In doing so, it became the first number-one hit on that chart for a female solo act since "Blessed" by Martina McBride in March–April 2002, and the first for Epic Records Nashville since "It Must Be Love" in December 1998. On the all-genre Billboard Hot 100, the song reached number 22, becoming Wilson's highest-charting single on that chart.

Outside the United States, "Redneck Woman" proved to be a moderate success in three countries: Australia, Ireland, and the United Kingdom. In Australia, the song debuted and peaked at number 50 on the chart dated July 25, 2004, but fell out of the top 50 the next week. On the Irish Singles Chart, the track made its only appearance in the top 50 at number 45 on August 26, 2004. In the United Kingdom, the single garnered support from BBC Radio 2 and debuted at number 42—its peak—on August 29, 2004, then dropped to number 68 the following week before exiting the top 100 the week after.

Music video 
In the video, directed by David Hogan, Wilson is depicted performing in a western-style club with a live band, cage girls dancing in the background, and patrons in the crowd that are drinking beer. Scenes of Wilson driving a 1973–1987 General Motors pickup truck and a four-wheeler through the mud with two men are interspersed throughout the video. The video includes appearances from Kid Rock, Big & Rich, Tanya Tucker, and Bocephus, the latter two of whom are name-dropped in the song. In 2008, CMT voted the song number 11 on its list of the "100 Greatest Videos".

Track listings
UK CD single
 "Redneck Woman"
 "Rebel Child"
 "It Ain't Easy"
 "Redneck Woman" (video)

Australian CD single
 "Redneck Woman" (album version)
 "Rebel Child"
 "It Ain't Easy"

Credits and personnel
Credits are taken from the Here for the Party album booklet.

Studios
 Recorded and overdubbed at Sony/Tree Studios (Nashville, Tennessee)
 Additional overdubs recorded at Blackbird Studio and 16th Avenue Sound (Nashville, Tennessee)
 Tracked at The Sound Kitchen (Franklin, Tennessee)
 Mixed at Blackbird Studio (Nashville, Tennessee)
 Mastered at MasterMix (Nashville, Tennessee)

Personnel

 Gretchen Wilson – writing, vocals
 John Rich – writing, acoustic guitar, associate producer
 John Willis – acoustic guitar
 Al Anderson – gut string guitar
 Tom Bukovac – electric guitar
 Kenny Greenberg – electric guitar
 Russ Pahl – lap steel guitar, steel guitar, banjo
 Mike Brignardello – bass guitar, baritone guitar
 Michael Rhodes – bass guitar, baritone guitar
 Larry Franklin – fiddle
 Steve Nathan – piano
 Greg Morrow – drums, percussion

 Eric Darken – percussion
 Mark Wright – production
 Joe Scaife – production
 Greg Droman – tracking
 Todd Gunnerson – assistant tracking, additional overdub recording
 Bart Pursley – recording, mixing
 Paul Hart – recording assistant, mixing assistant
 Steve Marcantonio – additional overdub recording
 Lowell Reynolds – mixing assistant
 Hank Williams – mastering
 Ronnie Thomas – editing

Charts

Weekly charts

Year-end charts

Release history

"Redbird Fever"
In late 2004, Wilson recorded a re-written version, titled "Redbird Fever" to commemorate the St. Louis Cardinals' entering the World Series (as well as her devotion to the team). "Redbird Fever" spent one week at number 60 on the US Billboard Country Singles Chart dated for the week ending November 13, 2004.

In popular culture
In the third episode of the TV series Smash, Katharine McPhee performed the song in a karaoke bar.

Parodies
American parody artist Cledus T. Judd released a parody of "Redneck Woman" titled "Paycheck Woman" on his 2004 album Bipolar and Proud.

References

2004 songs
2004 debut singles
Epic Records singles
Gretchen Wilson songs
Song recordings produced by Mark Wright (record producer)
Songs written by Gretchen Wilson
Songs written by John Rich